Aspire Tower, also known as The Torch Doha, is a  skyscraper hotel located in the Aspire Zone complex in Doha, Qatar. Designed by architect Hadi Simaan and AREP and engineer Ove Arup and Partners, the tower served as the focal point for the 15th Asian Games hosted by Qatar in December 2006.

The tower is currently the tallest structure and building in Doha and Qatar, but it will be surpassed by the Dubai Towers Doha and the Barwa Tower, when either project is completed. The tower has also been known as Khalifa Sports Tower or Doha Olympic Tower.

Construction and use 
The tower was a landmark of the 2006 Asian Games due to its size and proximity to the main venue, the Khalifa International Stadium.

The final form consists of a 1-to-1.8-metre-thick, reinforced-concrete cylinder (the core), varying from 12 to 18 metres in diameter, encircled with radiating networks of cantilevered steel beams on each floor of its building modules. The modules themselves are composed of steel columns, metal decking, concrete slabs and outer tension and compression ring beams, which support glass-paneled outer walls. The bottom of each module is covered with glass fiber reinforced concrete. Beams, as well as steel struts tying all the structural components together, are bolted through the concrete core and hence are anchored into place, transferring vertical loads from perimeter columns and ring beams to the core.

See also 
 Hyperboloid structure
 List of towers
 Aspire Park

References

External links 

 
 Hadi Simaan website
  The Torch Doha
 
 The Aspire Tower: a case study on Constructalia
 Haver & Boecker - Information about the tower
 

Hotel buildings completed in 2007
Skyscrapers in Doha
Hyperboloid structures
Skyscraper hotels